Northumberland County was one of the original Nineteen Counties in New South Wales and is now one of the 141 Cadastral divisions of New South Wales. It included the area to the north of Broken Bay, including Lake Macquarie and Newcastle(Greater Newcastle). It was bounded by the part of the Hawkesbury River to the south, the Macdonald River to the south-west, and the Hunter River to the north.

Northumberland County was named after the English Northumberland, and named by Lieutenant Charles Menzies, commandant at Newcastle, about 1804.

Between 21 July 1948 and 19 December 1963, the county had a local government, the Northumberland County Council, which was abolished at the same time as the Cumberland County Council.

Parishes 
Northumberland County contains the following parishes:

References

Counties of New South Wales